The UK European Union Party (UKEU Party) was a minor pro-European political party in the United Kingdom, founded by lawyer Pierre Kirk in the prelude to the 2019 European Parliament election in the United Kingdom. The party was founded due to a perceived weak concentration on opposing Brexit by other pro-EU parties.

The party stood candidates in three constituencies (London, North-West England, South East England) many of whom were from other EU member states. No UKEUP MEPs were elected. Kirk stood as a UKEUP candidate in the 2019 Peterborough by-election, coming 14th out of 15 candidates and winning just 25 votes.

The party was deregistered on 11 November 2021.

Ideology
Aside from its strong pro-European stance, Kirk described the party as a socially liberal but fiscally conservative centrist group that endorsed policies such as improving healthcare, freedom of movement, a removal of tuition fees, and a boost to affordable housing. The party endorsed a unified EU defence force and the UK's adoption of the euro.

Election results

References

External links 
 European election 2019 – London-wide results

2019 establishments in the United Kingdom
2021 disestablishments in the United Kingdom
Centrist political parties in the United Kingdom
Defunct political parties in the United Kingdom
Political parties established in 2019
Political parties disestablished in 2021
Pro-European political parties in the United Kingdom